The 1905 Ontario general election was the 11th general election held in the Province of Ontario, Canada.  It was held on January 25, 1905, to elect the 98 Members of the 11th Legislative Assembly of Ontario ("MLAs").

The Ontario Conservative Party, led by Sir James P. Whitney, defeated the Ontario Liberal Party, led by Sir George William Ross, bringing to an end the control of the government that the Liberal Party had exercised power for the previous 34 years.

Results

|-
! colspan=2 rowspan=2 | Political party
! rowspan=2 | Party leader
! colspan=5 | MPPs
! colspan=3 | Votes
|-
! Candidates
!1902
!Dissol.
!1905
!±
!#
!%
! ± (pp)

|style="text-align:left;"|James P. Whitney
|98
|48
|
|69
|21
|237,612
|53.37%
|5.83

|style="text-align:left;"|George William Ross
|95
|50
|
|28
|22
|198,595
|44.61%
|5.04

|style="text-align:left;"|
|3
|–
|
|1
|1
|5,362
|1.20%
|

|style="text-align:left;"|
|1
|–
|–
|–
|
|95
|0.02%
|0.36

|style="text-align:left;"|
|2
|–
|–
|–
|
|100
|0.02%
|1.16

|style="text-align:left;"|
|2
|–
|–
|–
|
|1,906
|0.43%
|0.29

|style="text-align:left;"|
|7
|–
|–
|–
|
|1,273
|0.29%
|0.17

|style="text-align:left;"|
|2
|–
|–
|–
|
|250
|0.06%
|

|style="text-align:left;"|
|–
|–
|–
|–
|
|colspan="3"|Did not campaign

|colspan="3"|
|
|colspan="5"|
|-style="background:#E9E9E9;"
|colspan="3" style="text-align:left;"|Total
|210
|98
|98
|98
|
|445,193
|100.00%
|
|-
|colspan="8" style="text-align:left;"|Blank and invalid ballots
|align="right"|3,254
|style="background:#E9E9E9;" colspan="2"|
|-style="background:#E9E9E9;"
|colspan="8" style="text-align:left;"|Registered voters / turnout
|616,996
|72.68%
|1.87
|}

Seats that changed hands

There were 32 seats that changed allegiance in the election:

Liberal to Conservative
Brant
Bruce South
Durham West
Fort William and Lake of the Woods
Halton
Kent East
Lambton East
Lanark North
Middlesex East
Middlesex North
Muskoka
Nipissing East
Nipissing West

Norfolk South
Ontario South
Parry Sound
Perth South
Peterborough West
Renfrew South
Simcoe Centre
Stormont
Welland
Wellington East
York East
York North
York West

 Liberal to Independent-Liberal
Hastings East

 Conservative to Liberal
Glengarry
Norfolk North
Ottawa (both MLAs)
Sault Ste. Marie

See also
Politics of Ontario
List of Ontario political parties
Premier of Ontario
Leader of the Opposition (Ontario)

References

Further reading
 

1905 elections in Canada
1905
1905 in Ontario
January 1905 events